Xiphinema bakeri is a plant pathogenic nematode infecting caneberries.

See also 
 List of caneberries diseases

References

External links 
 Nemaplex, University of California - Xiphinema bakeri

Agricultural pest nematodes
Small fruit diseases
Longidoridae